Piccioni is an Italian surname meaning "pigeon". Notable people with the surname include:

Attilio Piccioni (1892–1976), Italian politician
Enrico Piccioni (born 1961), Italian footballer
Gianmarco Piccioni (born 1991), Italian footballer
Giuseppe Piccioni (born 1953), Italian film director and screenwriter
Marco Piccioni (born 1976), Italian footballer
Oreste Piccioni (1915–2002), Italian-American physicist
Piero Piccioni (1921–2004), Italian lawyer and film composer
Fabio Piccioni (1938–2020), Italian screenwriter and movie director
Norman Piccioni (1963–present), Italian agricultural economist

See also
Piccione

Italian-language surnames